Morong, officially the Municipality of Morong, is a 3rd class municipality in the province of Bataan, Philippines. According to the 2020 census, it has a population of 35,394 people.

The municipality is home to Subic Bay International Airport, the Bataan Nuclear Power Plant, and the former Philippine Refugee Processing Center. Morong was formerly known as Moron. It is accessible via the Bataan Provincial Expressway, off Exit 65.

History

In 1607, Morong was established when the Order of Augustinian Recollects built a church in a small populated village in Bataan. The original site of the church was said to have been in Barangay Nagbalayong, a village southeast of Morong. The orderly rectangular layout of the streets and roads of Nagbalayong Proper is attributable to the rural planning efforts of the AOR.

In the mid 1800s, the municipal center was moved to a more central location relative to other barangays. This new central barangay was named Poblacion and was given a similar rural planning design to Nagbalayong, wherein the streets are arranged in an orderly rectangular pattern. A significantly larger church was also built in Poblacion.

The oldest records about Morong was written by the Augustian Order of Recollects (AOR) and the town always had been referred to as Moron as far back as 1607. There is no evidence that the town was ever named or referred to as Bayandati. Nagbalayong was only colloquially referred to as Bayandati, owing to the transfer of the town proper from Nagbalayong to Poblacion.

Folkloric tradition alludes the etymology of the name Moron to the Spaniards' mishearing of the phrase "mga Moro umurong" when they asked the local people the name of their village. While there are many records of Muslim led slave-raiding expeditions in the 18th and 19th Century, there is no historical record substantiating this claim. The problem of slave raiding did however influence the architecture of the Morong Church, which was built as a church-fortress.

The most probable etymology comes from the Spanish word morón which refers to a hill which can be seen from the sea. Several towns in Spain and in Spanish colonies are also named Morón, namely Morón in Cuba; Morón de la Fronterra in Sevilla, Spain; and Morón in Buenos Aires, Argentina, to name a few. These place all have hilly topographies and are nearby the ocean.

On June 10, 1955, with the understanding of the Spanish language waning in most of the Philippines and with Moron having an unfortunate meaning in English, the town was renamed Morong by virtue of Republic Act No. 1249.

Establishment of the town by the Order of Augustinian Recollects 

The Augustinian Order of Recollects (AOR) arrived in the Philippines in 1606 and a year later, in 1607, they began mission work in Zambales. By 1612, the AOR claimed and organized 12 communities in the surrounding area into towns each with small churches and convents. 
It is said that in 1607, Morong was officially founded as an ecclesiastical parish by the Augustinian Recollects as well as being founded by Fr. Rodrigo de San Miguel who placed it under the protection of the Our Lady of the Pillar.

The Our Lady of the Pillar Parish of Morong, established in 1607 and is now one of the oldest seats of Catholic faith in the Philippines;. The AOR fortress-church made with local stony corals (Porites species) was built around 1890s. The design of the church is similar to Augustinian Recollect built church, the Sta. Monica Church of Botolan, Zambales, also built with stony corals.

The church has been damaged extensively three times. In 1890, the church was damaged by a strong typhoon and after a few months, fire damaged the convent. During WWII, the church was sent on fire by the invading Japanese Imperial Army, collapsing the roof.

During the Philippine War of Independence from Spain, the anti-friar sentiment among Filipinos reached a boiling point. During this war, several friars were imprisoned and several were also killed by Filipino Revolutionaries. Fray Domingo Cabrejas, cura of Morong and Fray Jose San Juan, cura of Bagac were killed by Filipino Revolutionaries. After several months, the Spanish government sent in retaliation a regiment of the Guardia Civil to capture and kill the revolutionaries of Morong.

World War II

Morong during WWII 

For the defense of Bataan, the main and first battle position established by the USAFFE was the Mabatang (Abucay)–Mauban (Morong) Line. General Wainwright was in command of the Mauban side of the defense. The 1st Infantry Division of the Philippine Army, under Gen. Fidel Segundo defended the Morong Town Proper.

On 15 January 1942, the reinforced 1st Infantry Division (Philippines) of Gen. Fidel Segundo, defending the Morong came under heavy bombardment, but successfully held the line.

On 16 January 1942, the Imperial Japanese Army marched towards the town of Morong. An alarm force of combined Filipino and American forces was then positioned in the town decided to engage the Japanese forces. The 26th Cavalry Regiment led by Lieutenant Edwin P. Ramsey successfully forced the Japanese 122d Infantry to a retreat. The 27 heavily outnumbered Filipino and American cavalrymen charged and scattered the surprised Japanese. It was the last charge of American cavalry

On 17 January 1942, the Japanese Army returned and engaged Wainwright's forces which then retreated to the Mauban Line finally abandoning Morong Town Proper.

Morong residents join the guerilla forces 
On 28 July 1942, Capt. Ralph McGuire, Capt. E.S Johnson along with a company of soldiers went to Morong to organize the Guerilla Movement in the town. The Morong Town guerillas came to be what is now formally known as the 3rd Regiment, Bataan Military District, East Central Luzon General Area.

The incumbent town mayor at the time, Mayor Angeles was inducted as Sector Commander and given the rank of Captain. After two months of organizing, in September 1942 over 1,400 residents of Morong joined the guerilla force. With Mayor Angeles leading more than a regiment of guerillas, he was then promoted to Colonel.

In 15 October 1943, Capt. Ralph McGuire was killed-in-action in Poon Bato, Botolan, Zambales and with his passing the Morong Town Guerilla Sector lost their contact with the East Central Luzon General Area. The activities of the  Morong Town Guerilla Sector resumed in 1944 when the emissaries of John Boone went to the town to re-establish guerilla activities of the group.

Issues of the forgotten heroes of Morong, Bataan 
All over the country and the world, the heroism of WWII veterans who fought in Bataan are commemorated. Towns and cities, such as Marikina, have erected monuments to honor their citizens who have fought or fallen in defense of Bataan.

In the whole of Bataan, only the town of Morong has no memorial markers have been erected by the government despite the historical significance and sacrifice of the town and its residents during the war. Ever since after the war, the national, provincial and local government has made no efforts to commemorate the brave souls that fought and died in Morong.

A town left sacrificed and undefended during the war, now filled with graves of heroes forsaken and unrecognized.

Geography

According to the Philippine Statistics Authority, the municipality has a land area of  constituting  of the  total area of Bataan.

Morong is bounded by Dinalupihan to the northeast, Hermosa and Orani to the east, and province of the Zambales to the north. Olongapo City is located directly north of Morong, accessible via SBMA–Olongapo Access Road through Rizal Highway to Aguinado Road or Security Road to East 14th Street.

Environmental protection 
The Pawikan Conservation Center is a community-based effort to protect turtles in Morong with a focus on protecting the Olive Ridley species.

Climate
Morong has a tropical monsoon climate (Af) with little to no rainfall from December to April and heavy to extremely heavy rainfall from May to November.

Barangays
Morong is politically subdivided into 5 barangays.

Demographics

According to the Spanish Census of the country in 1896, Morong was reported to have 2,797 inhabitants.

In the 2020 census, Morong had a population of 35,394.

Economy 

Existing industries in Morong include mango/cashew production as well as vinegar making from nipa palm nuts and the production of basketry using jungle vines.

There is some variety of developments intended for Morong. Industries targeted for development are the manufacturing of component parts or assembly operations. In addition, there are plans to establish convention centers, exhibit halls, golf course and clubs, entertainment and leisure and sports centers, hotels, beach resorts and meditation centers.

Mining 
Morong has also had some activity in mining. In 1972 it had mining activity from Long Beach Mining Corporation producing magnetite concentrate from beach sands and in 2017 there was headway into opening 709.6 hectares of land to Gandara minerals and development corporation in order to mine basalt and other associated minerals.

Economic zone developments 

The Bataan Technology Park (informally called the "Technopark") is the main zone of the Morong Special Economic Zone (MSEZ), established in March 1997 after a previous ecozone which was established under the 1992 Bases Conversion and Development Act. The park's investors can claim the following benefits:

 A 5% levy on Gross Income Earned (in lieu of all national and local taxes and duties)
 Tax and duty-free importation of raw materials and capital equipment
 Management of the zone as a separate customs territory, ensuring the free flow of movement of goods and capital equipment within, imported and exported out of the zone
 The Atmanda Ecopark also has potential as a retirement haven and a corporate training center

Government

Popular culture
The Subic Explosive Ordnance Disposal, located at the Morong portion of Subic Bay Freeport Zone, made an appearance on various teleseryes such as ABS-CBN's May Bukas Pa and Noah.

Gallery

References

External links

[ Philippine Standard Geographic Code]

Municipalities of Bataan